Sam Joseph Martin (born February 27, 1990) is an American football punter for the Buffalo Bills of the National Football League (NFL). He played college football at Appalachian State, and was drafted by the Detroit Lions in the fifth round of the 2013 NFL Draft.

Early years
Martin was lettered for soccer for four years and also received all-state recognition in his junior season at Starr's Mill High School.

College career
In his senior season, he was selected to the Associated Press All-America First team. He also was named to the first-team All-America by College Sports Journal and third-team all-America by The Sports Network in his senior season.

Professional career

Detroit Lions
In Week 12 of the 2015 season, Martin was awarded as the NFC Special Teams Player of the Week for four punts totaling 181 yards and only three punt return yards.

Martin signed a four-year contract extension with the Lions on September 9, 2016.  At the conclusion of the 2016 NFL season, Martin was named as an alternate for the 2017 Pro Bowl, but did not participate in the game.

On September 2, 2017, Martin was placed on the non-football injury list after suffering an ankle injury during the offseason. He was activated to the active roster on October 28, 2017 for the team's Week 8 game against the Pittsburgh Steelers.

Denver Broncos
On March 30, 2020, Martin signed a three year, $7.05 million deal with the Denver Broncos.

Martin was released by the Broncos on August 29, 2022 after he refused to take a pay cut.

Buffalo Bills
On August 31, 2022, Martin signed a one year deal with the Buffalo Bills. He signed a three-year, $7.5 million contract extension on March 13, 2023.

References

External links
Denver Broncos bio
Appalachian State Mountaineers bio

1990 births
Living people
People from Fayetteville, Georgia
Sportspeople from the Atlanta metropolitan area
Players of American football from Georgia (U.S. state)
American football punters
Appalachian State Mountaineers football players
Detroit Lions players
Denver Broncos players
Buffalo Bills players